Philippe Neerman (1930–2011) was a Belgian industrial designer and President of Industrial Design Planning Office Philippe Neerman & Co. N.V.\S.A. He was known for his application of ergonomics in public transportation systems and his work on major projects such as the Royal Library of Belgium, the Royal Castle of Laeken, and the Royal Palace of Brussels. He also participated in the international Design Biennale Interieur in Courtray, Belgium. He mainly focused on transportation and made designs for metros and trams including the Euro Tram, the Brussels Metro, and the Metro in Barcelona. His work has been incorporated into a diverse collection of museums, including the Ghent Design Museum.

Early life
Neerman was born in 1930 in the Belgian Congo to a Belgian father and a French mother. He grew up in Brussels in an artistic family but made many trips to France during his childhood, including during the World War II era. In Ghent, Belgium, he studied interior design, furniture design and management.

Career
Neerman graduated from L'École de la Cambre in 1953. After his studies, Neerman moved to Kortrijk, where he worked for a company named De Coene, a Belgian art decore and design firm. He was involved with setting up the Brussels Design Centre after beginning his work with De Coene and claims to be the originator of the Centre. As he indicated himself in the mid-1950s several fellow designers were won over to the goal of having a Brussels-based DC. During the end of his career at De Coene, he designed the Philips Chair for the company's home office in Eindhoven. He was commissioned in 1955 by the Belgian Ministry of Economic Affairs to set up the Institute of Industrial Aesthetics and the Design Centre.

Neerman created his own company in 1967 and was among the first European industrial designers to adapt ergonomic studies to the design of public transportation while working on projects such as the Metro of Brussels, and the Metro of Lyons & Marseille. After working on numerous transportation system projects, he began to concentrate on different transportation systems such as buses, trains, people movers, and tramways. During that time, he also focused on interior and furniture design for different buildings.

Neerman was a professor at the National Higher Institute of Architecture and Urbanism in Antwerp until 1995.

Career history

 1953–54: Collaborator, Mobilier Universel Jules Wabbes (Brussels)
 1954–62: Plant manager, SAIB De Coene et Freres N.V., Courtray;
 1962–67: Project manager, SAIB De Coene et Freres N.V.,(Courtray)
 1966–73: Lecturer, Institut National Superieur d'Architecture et des Arts Visuels, Brussels;
 1972: Professor, Nationaal Hoger Instituut voor Bouwkunst en Stedebouw, Antwerpen;
 1972: Lecturer, University of Lille, Compiegne, Pretoria;
 1967–70:Private office;
 1970–86: Counciller, Industrial Design Planning Office, Philippe Neerman & Co pvba\sprl, Courtray;
 1986-: President, Industrial Design Planning Office, Philippe Neerman & Co N.V.\S.A., Courtray

Notable works
 Royal Library of Belgium;
 Institut royal du patrimoine artistique;
 Royal Castle of Laeken,
 Royal Palace of Brussels;
 The I.M.C.A.G. in Charleroi;
 Royal Museum for Central Africa;
 Rolling stock on rails:-Brusame
 Light rail vehicles:- Nantes, Grenoble, Strasbourg, Orléans streetcar,
 Hydraulic power stations
 Centralized operating centers, control towers.
 Furniture design

Publications
Neerman's works have been incorporated in different publications such as journals and books, including the le Soir, Tram, and Bouwen voor de natie.
 Callico, Catherine (August 2000). "Neerman dans le métro". le Soir 30: 26.
 Binst, Jean-Marie (December 2000). "The Metro, and beyond". Tram 81 30: 20.
 "The Metro, and beyond". Tram 81 30: 20. December 2000.
 L'Année du Tram. Strasbourg: Les Editions&Ronald Hirle. 1994. pp. 182–193..
 Anna Albano, Paola Ranzini; Edith Doove (June 2000). Dynamic City. Brussels: Skira/Seuil. pp. 83–90. .
 Bouwen voor de natie. Gent: Academia Press. 2012. pp. 183–199. .
 Chery, François (August 1996). "Tramway" Penser le futur 310: 41–43.
 Dinarich, Mario (September 1989). "Design research and cooperation of the undergrounds of Marseille and Lyon". Transport design forum 158:114–120.
 Maes, Guido(March 1999). "Citadis tramway lyon 1997".Iconen van design in Vlaanderen 167: 62–63
 Le stylo à bille Le design. Le tramway de strasbourg le confort dans la ville. 1998.pp. 52–55.
 Febvre, Jacqueline; Isabelle Monier (September 1999). I.D.P.O.-Neerman Consulting. Paris: A.P.C.I. pp. 104–105. .
 Febvre, Jacqueline; Isabelle Monier (September 2001). I.D.P.O.-Neerman Consulting. Paris: A.P.C.I. pp. 104–105. .

Gallery

Personal life
Neerman married Denise Kinet in 1952 and had 2 sons, Olivier Neerman and Johan Neerman. Johan took over the family business in 1999.

References

External links 

 

1930 births
2011 deaths
20th-century Belgian architects
Industrial designers
Belgian designers
Urban design
Belgian furniture designers